Jászberényi KSE, shortly JKSE, is a Hungarian professional basketball team based in Jászberény. The team plays in the Nemzeti Bajnokság I/A, the highest professional league in Hungary. The team was founded in 2001.

History
Jászberényi KSE was founded in 2001. In 2005, KSE promoted to the Hungarian Second Division. In the 2009–10 season, the team was close to promoting, as it finished 3rd in the league. In the 2010–11 season, the team won the Playoffs and were named Second Division Champions. Starting from 2011 the team played in the first tier league. In the 2013–14 season, JKSE meade its first European appearance in the EuroChallenge. The team had a 0–6 record in the competition, as it was eliminated in the regular season.

Season by season

 Cancelled due to the COVID-19 pandemic in Hungary.

European record
Jászberényi had a 0–6 (0%) record in one season of European play, which was the 2013–14 FIBA EuroChallenge.

Notable players

 Bruno Šundov 
 Miljan Rakić

References

External links
Official website
Team profile at eurobasket.com

Basketball teams in Hungary